Flags of the world's nations vary in the number of colours, ranging from one colour to more than forty.

One colour

  (750–1258)
 
  (September 27, 1996–October 26, 1997)
  (May 28, 1490–1636)
  (1848–1947)
  (1699–1948)
  (1734–1936)
  (1680–1767)
  (1171–1260)
  (?–1874)
  (1368–1906)
  (1342–1949)
 
 
  (909–1171)
  (1918–1918)
  (1731–1818)
  (1014–1152)
  (1709–1738)
  (1919)
  (1732–1818)
  (1846–1952)
  (1838–1949)
  (1728–1858)
  (1348–1948)
  (1710–1949)
  (1929–1931)
  (1733–1948)
  (1733–1948)
  (1977–2011)
  (1520–1905)
  (1796–1903)
  (1674–1818)
  (1856–1970)
  (1739–1853)
  (1633–1934)
 
 
  (1518–1687)
  (632–661)
  (777–909)
  (1782–1948)
  (1919–1919)
  (1977-2011)
 
 
  (973–1146)

Two colours

 
 
 
 

 
 
 
 
 
 
  (civil ensign)
 
 
 
 
 
 
 
 
  (civil flag and ensign)
 
 
 
 
 
 
 
 
 
 
  (civil ensign)
 
 
 
 

 
 
 
 
 
 
 
 
 
  (army flag)
 
 
 
 
 
 
 
 
  (state flag and ensign)
  (naval ensign)
 
 
 
 
 
 
 
 
 
 
 
 
 
 
 
 
 
  (civil flag and ensign)
 
 
 
  (civil flag and ensign)
 
 
 
  (naval ensign)
 
 
 
 
 
 
 
 
  (naval ensign and flag of the Japan Maritime Self-Defense Force)
 
 
 
 
 
 
 
 
 
 
 
 
 
 
 
 
 
 
 
 
 
 
 
 
 
 
 
 
 
 
 
 
 
 
 
 
 
 
 
 
 
 
 
 
 
 
 
 
 
 
 
 
 
 
 
 
 
 
 
 
 
 
 
 
 
 
 
 
  (merchant flag)
 
 
 
 
 
 
 
 
 
 
 
 
 
 
 
 
 
 
 
  (variant without coat of arms)
 
 
 
 
 
 
 
 
 
 
 
  (naval ensign)

Three colours

 
 
 
 
 
 
 
  (naval ensign)
 
 
 
 
 
 
 
 
 
  (civil ensign)
  (naval ensign)
 
 
 
 
  (naval ensign)
  (Air ensign)
 
 
 
 
 
 
 
 
 
  (civil flag and ensign)
  (state ensign)
 
 
 
 
 
 
 
 
 
 
 
 
 
 
 
 

 
 
 
 
 
 
 
 
 
 
 
 
 
 
 
 
 
 
 
  (civil flag and ensign)
 
 
 
 
 
 
 
 
 
 
 
  (civil ensign)
 
 
 
 
 
 
 
 
  (civil and naval ensign)
 
  (naval ensign)
 
 
 
 
 
 
 
 
 
 
 
  (state flag)
 
 
 
 
 
 
 
 
 
 
 
 
 
 
 
 
 
 
 
 
 
 
  (1919–1925)
 
 
 
 
 
 
 
 
 
 
 
 
 
 
 
 
 
 
 
 
 
 
 
  (2001–2020)
 
 
 
 
 
 
 
  (Oldest tricolor)
 
 
 
 
 
 
 
 
 
 
 
 
 
 
 
 
 
 
 
 
 
 
 
 
 
 
 
 
 
 
 
 
 
 
 
 
 
 
 
  (civil flag)
 
 
 
 
 
 
 
 
 
 
  (Taiwan)
 
 
 
 
 
 
 
 
  Transgender Pride flag
 
 
 
 
 
 
  (naval ensign)
  (government ensign)
  (civil ensign)

Four colours

 
 
  (2013–2021)
 
  (naval ensign)
 
 
 
 
 
 
 
 
 
  (air force ensign)
 
 
 
 
 
 
  (army flag)
  (naval ensign)
  (air force ensign)
 
 
 
 
 
 
 
 
 
 
 
 
 
 
 
 
 
 
 
  (civil ensign)
 
 
 
 
 
 
 
 
 
  (naval ensign)
 
 
  (1958–1959)
 
 
 
 
  (civil ensign)
 
 
  (naval ensign)
 
 
 
 
 
  (1968-2003)
 
 
 
 
 
 
 
 
 
 
 
 
  (1951-1969 and from 2011)
 
 
 
 
 
 
 
 
 
 
 
 
 
 
 
 
 
 
 
 
 
 
 
 
 
 
 
 
 
  (1797–1879)
 
 
 
 
 
 
 
 
 
 
 
 
 
 
 
 
 
 
 
 
 
 
 
 
 
 
 
 
 
  (civil flag)
 
 
 
  (1971-1997)

Five colours

 
 
 
 
  (civil ensign)
  (naval ensign)

  (naval ensign)
 
 
 
 
 
 
 
 
 
  (air force ensign)
 
 
 
  (state flag and ensign)
  (war flag and naval ensign)
 
 
 
 
 
 
 
 
 
 
 
 
 
 
 
 
 
 
 
 
 
 
 
 
 
 
 
 
 
 
 
 
 
 
 
 
 
  (1912–1928)
  (1841–1997)
 
 
  (1593–1611)

Six colours
 
 
  (civil and state ensign)
  (naval ensign)
 
 
  (civil ensign)
  (government ensign)
  (naval ensign)
 
 
 
 
 
 
  (1557–1999)

Seven colours
 
  (naval ensign)
 
 
 
 
 
 
  (with multicolored emblem), 1964-1986

Eight colours
 
  (state flag)

References 

 Number of colors
Color schemes